Saole County is a county in the Eastern District in American Samoa. The county consists of Aunu'u Island together with its foothold upon Tutuila Island, Ālōfau and Āmouli.

Demographics

Saole County was first recorded beginning with the 1912 special census. Regular decennial censuses were taken beginning in 1920.

Villages
Aunu'u Island
 Āmouli
Utumea
Ālōfau (including 'Au'asi and a portion of Pagai)

References 

 

Populated places in American Samoa